Damion Berger is a British contemporary photographer. He works with a large-format camera. A book of his swimming-pool photographs, In the Deep End, was published in 2011.

References

Further reading 

Introducing: Damion Berger “In The Deep End”, Aserica Magazine, Lu JiaYing, 7 December 2014
Experiments in photography push the envelope and reference the classics at Heckscher, LI Pulse, Drew Moss, 21 November 2014
Art in review: AIPAD Photography Show, New York Times, Ken Johnson, 4 April 2013
AIPAD Photography Show: Top Ten, Art in America, Tracy Zwick, 5 April 2013
Contemporary Photographers Stand Out at NY’s AIPAD Fair, Blouin Artinfo, Lori Fredrickson, 5 April 2013
AIPAD 2013 at the Armory, AI-PI Design Arts Daily, Peggy Roalf, 4 April 2013
Damion Berger, Jill Greenberg, Erwin Olaf, Stephen Wilkes…, FotoMAGAZIN ‘Portfolio Issue’, No.2, 2012
Damion Berger: In The Deep End, LENSCRATCH, 8 October 2012
Winners of the 5th Annual Spider Awards, The Photo Paper
Esteemed image makers name their favourites, American Photo, Jack Crager, May 2010
Backstory: Damion Berger goes below the surface, Popular Photography, Lori Fredrickson, February 2010
Ventiquatro Magazine, Il Sole 24, 4 September 2009
Bomblog: Damion Berger, Bomb Magazine, Alec Quig, 27 July 2009
Q & A with Damion Berger, Photo District News, Amber Terranova, 18 June 2009
In The Deep End, NPR The Picture Show, Claire O’Neill, 11 June 2009
Interview with Photographer Damion Berger, Alec Quig, June 2009
Tomorrow's People, British Journal of Photography, 28 May 2008
Review: In The Deep End at the Eden Rock, St Barths, Mic Magazine, August 2007
Special Art: L’Art coup de Coeur, Cote Magazine, June 2007
Interview: ‘In The Deep End’ a la galerie Art & Rapy, Cote Magazine, May 2006
Spotlight: Damion Berger, B&W Magazine, Issue 31, June 2004
R.S.V.P: An Invitation into Damion Berger's World, PDN Photo District News, Jacqueline Tobin
Rien ne va plus, is Damion Berger a master in the making?, Hotshoe, Melissa De Witt

1978 births
Living people
Photographers from New York City